Substation #401, also called the "Essex Sub-station" is a historic New York City Subway electrical substation. 

This facility is located on the south side of Fulton Street, between Essex Street and Shepherd Avenue, in the Cypress Hills neighborhood of the borough of Brooklyn. It sits adjacent to the BMT Jamaica Line between the Cleveland Street and Norwood Avenue stations.

It was built in 1901 by the Brooklyn Rapid Transit Company for the Cypress Hills extension of the BMT Lexington Avenue Line, and is a Beaux Arts style structure. Through a series of acquisitions, it was passed over to the Brooklyn-Manhattan Transit Corporation, then the New York City Board of Transportation, the New York City Transit Authority, and finally the Metropolitan Transportation Authority (MTA), where it remains to this day.

It was listed on the National Register of Historic Places in 2005.

References

Buildings and structures on the National Register of Historic Places in New York City
Transportation buildings and structures in Brooklyn
Industrial buildings and structures in Brooklyn
Beaux-Arts architecture in New York City
Energy infrastructure completed in 1901
Transport infrastructure completed in 1901
Brooklyn–Manhattan Transit Corporation
New York City Designated Landmarks in Brooklyn
East New York, Brooklyn
New York City Subway infrastructure
National Register of Historic Places in Brooklyn
1901 establishments in New York City